V/Vm Test records was a record label based in Stockport, England and was started by James Leyland Kirby (V/Vm) and Andrew Macgregor (Jansky Noise, Animal) in 1996. It does not have an overseas division, so releases on it tend to be collectable outside of the United Kingdom.

The label releases artists works from a wide variety of genres including noise, soundscape, breakcore, mashup and many more that don't fit comfortably into any genre.

V/Vm Test Records are notable for their rebellious approach, often involving blatant copyright infringement, most notable are the artists V/Vm themselves, often taking a popular song and running it through various filters the end result being a de-tuned and distorted version of the original. The Sick Love album contains several notable examples of this style, as well as the frequent references to Pigs that colour most V/Vm releases.

Notable acts on V/Vm Test have included: Jega, Kid606, Hell Interface (Boards of Canada), Kevin Blechdom, Goodiepal, Knifehandchop and Datach'i.

V/Vm Test has been instrumental in giving away free and unrestricted downloads since 1997 on his website and via various V/Vm Test associated Microsites. In 2006 V/Vm set up an addition label, Vukzid and also a number of extra microsites which gave away free audio and visual content along with working on a unique daily project which saw the artist V/Vm record at least one piece of audio per day which was then uploaded and given away for free (for the whole of 2006).

In 2007 V/Vm Test also launched the Freenoise Archives which has over 3GB of out of print noise releases available for free download via a microsite.

In end of 2008, V/Vm Test Records ceased its operations and changed to History Always Favours The Winners.

See also
 List of record labels

External links 
V/Vm Test Records
V/Vm Test Records at discogs.com
[ V/Vm at allmusic.com]
V/Vm Vukzid Free Audio Downloads
The V/Vm Test 365 project - free V/Vm downloads for the whole of 2006
The Caretaker Microsite
The Freenoise Archives
Belgian New-Beat Microsite
The Goodiepal Microsite

British record labels
Electronic music record labels
Noise music record labels
Record labels established in 1996